Musk railway station is a railway station at the locality of Musk, in central Victoria, Australia. It was opened in September 1881 under the name of Musk Creek, and its name was shortened to Musk in 1905. The line closed on Monday, 3 July 1978.

By 1975, the station was working under no-one-in-charge conditions.

Re-opening
During the mid to late 1980s, Gangers trolleys conveyed passengers on short trips to the Wombat State Forest, about halfway between Daylesford and Musk. On 15 September 1990, railmotor services were restored between Daylesford and Musk for the first time in 13 years. The section of line between Musk and Bullarto was reopened on 17 March 1997.

Musk Station consists of little more than a small platform and a tin shed, and is stopped at by most tourist services operated by the Daylesford Spa Country Railway.

References

Victoria (Australia) tourist railway stations